Krom River or Kromme River is a river in the Eastern Cape Province in South Africa. The river flows into the Indian Ocean through an estuary on the north side of St Francis Bay, west of Port Elizabeth. The Krom river flows in an ESE direction and is approximately 109 km long with a catchment area of 1,085 km.

The Churchill Dam and the Impofu Dam are dams on the Krom River. The latter is located near Humansdorp. Presently this river is part of the Fish to Tsitsikama Water Management Area.

Ecology
In 1995 specimens of the Cape galaxias (Galaxias zebratus), a South African fish species endemic to the Cape Floristic Region, were found in the Krom River. Until then it had been thought that its distribution was restricted to the area between the Keurbooms and the Olifants River. Although in South Africa this relatively delicate fish is only classified as near threatened, in Australia species of the same genus were driven to extinction by competing salmonids and other introduced species of fish. Since the beginning of 2021 there have been a high number of bull sharks present in the river.

See also 
 List of rivers of South Africa
List of estuaries of South Africa

References

External links
IUCN Red List - Galaxias zebratus
Working for Wetlands - Krom River

Rivers of the Eastern Cape
Internal borders of South Africa